is a private junior college in Takasaki, Gunma, Japan. Originally established as a women's junior college in 1983, it became co-educational in 2004.

External links
 Official website 

Japanese junior colleges
Educational institutions established in 1983
Private universities and colleges in Japan
Universities and colleges in Gunma Prefecture
1983 establishments in Japan
Takasaki, Gunma